Sensitivity analysis studies the relation between the uncertainty  and the uncertainties in the model assumptions. Sensitivity analysis can play an important role in epidemiology, for example in assessing the influence of the unmeasured confounding on the causal conclusions of a study. It is also important in all mathematical modelling studies of epidemics. 

Sensitivity analysis can be used in epidemiology, for example in assessing the influence of the unmeasured confounding on the causal conclusions of a study. Given the significant uncertainty at play, the use of sensitivity analysis to apportion the output uncertainty into input parameters is crucial in the context of Decision-making.

References 

Mathematical modeling
 
Mathematical analysis
Epidemiology